She Was Pretty is a 2015 South Korean television series starring Hwang Jung-eum, Park Seo-joon, Go Joon-hee and Choi Si-won. It aired on MBC from September 16 to November 11, 2015, on Wednesdays and Thursdays at 22:00.

The series was both a hit domestically, with a peak rating of 18.4% and internationally, especially in China.

Synopsis
A romantic comedy, based on a true story, about two past acquaintances who meet again after they've gone through a reversal of fortunes and appearances, set against the backdrop of a fashion magazine's publishing office.

Kim Hye-jin was a beautiful girl from a rich family, the Chas. After her family's publishing company went bankrupt, she experienced hardships then lost her beauty too. Ji Sung-joon was an unattractive boy with low self-esteem, but grows up to be a handsome and successful editor.

The two decided to meet again as adults, but Sung-joon was unable to recognize Hye-jin. Ashamed to meet her first love and ruin his perception of her, Hye-jin asks her attractive best friend, Ha-ri, to appear in her place. Things, however, soon get complicated as Hye-jin was assigned to work at The Most magazine publishing office where Sung-joon is the deputy chief editor. He openly mistreats and belittles her for her clumsy nature, not knowing that she was his real childhood friend. Ha-ri also continues to meet Sung-joon, and soon develops feelings for him. On the other hand, Hye-jin finds a good friend in her workplace, Shin-hyuk, who slowly falls in love with her.

Cast

Main
Hwang Jung-eum as Kim Hye-jin / Jackson
Jung Da-bin as young Hye-jin
An intern in the administration section before being appointed as junior editor. She used to be a beautiful, wealthy, and smart girl, but lost everything. Embarrassed at her failures in life, she asked her best friend Ha-ri, to meet with her first love Sung-joon, using her name. She thought that would be the end of her fate with Sung-joon, but turns out it's only the beginning of her nightmare, as he then becomes her boss. Despite the misfortunes, she still strives to do her best.
Park Seo-joon as Ji Sung-joon
Yang Han-yeol as young Sung-joon
The youngest deputy chief editor in Korea. Stubborn and arrogant but also brilliant in his work. Contrary to Hye-jin, he was unattractive and shy but grows up to become handsome and successful. Immediately after returning to Korea, he contacted his first love, Hye-jin. He ends up falling for her even when he didn't recognize that she was his childhood friend and first love.
Go Joon-hee as Min Ha-ri
Lee Ja-in as young Ha-ri
A hotelier. She is Hye-jin's best friend and roommate. A beautiful and stylish woman with good personality. While continuing to pretend to be Hye-jin, she ends up falling for Sung-joon. Fearing that her relationship with her best friend might be compromised, she tries several times to tell him the truth only to fail in the end and having Hye-jin find out first.
Choi Si-won as Kim Shin-hyuk / Ten / David Joseph
A senior Feature editor. He is generally a free-spirited, fair, and straightforward man but with mysterious identity (later found out to be the Korean writer, Ten). He is Hye-jin's direct supervisor at work, and they developed a close relationship. He ends up falling for her even before her beauty transformation. He found out about her relationship with Sung-joon one day when she was drunk.

Supporting

Hye-jin's family
Park Choong-sun as Kim Jong-seob, Hye-jin's father who is currently running a small printing house.
Lee Il-hwa as Han Jung-hye, Hye-jin's mother who also treats Ha-ri like her own daughter too.
Jung Da-bin as Kim Hye-rin, Hye-jin's younger sister who often prefers Ha-ri as her own sister instead of Hye-jin.

Ha-ri's family
Yoon Yoo-sun as Cha Hye-jung, Ha-ri's birth mother and Jung-hye's friend.
Lee Byung-joon as Min Yong-gil, Ha-ri's father
Seo Jeong-yeon as Na Ji-seon, Ha-ri's stepmother

People in The Most
Hwang Seok-jeong as Kim Ra-ra
The chief editor who is very fashionable and later found out that she is the chairman's younger sister. She speaks English, Korean, Italian, French and Spanish.
Shin Dong-mi as Cha Joo-young
Head of the Editing team and director of the Fashion team who is so dedicated to her work. She speaks on behalf of Hye-jin during her initial days and later becomes the deputy chief editor.
Ahn Se-ha as Kim Poong-ho
A lazy and untidy Feature director who orders his junior coworkers around. It is revealed later that he is the Jinsung Magazine CEO's son and eventually becomes the Vice President.
Shin Hye-sun as Han Seol
An assistant of the Beauty team who finds out about the fact that the chairman's son is one of her co-workers and sets out to become his love interest. She then dates Joon-woo and eventually falls for his friendly charms.
Park Yu-hwan as Kim Joon-woo
A cute and kind assistant of the Fashion team who had feelings for Han Seol from the day when she mistakes him as the chairman's son and reciprocates his feelings. He always respects his co-workers and it is later revealed that his parent is the owner of a laundry place.
Kang Soo-jin as Joo Ah-reum
The editor of the Beauty team who is getting married.
Cha Jung-won as Jung Sun-min
Bae Min-jung as Park Yi-kyung
Kim Jung-heon as Se-hoon
Im Ji-hyun as Lee Eun-young

People in Jinsung Magazine
Kim Ha-kyoon as Boo Joong-man
Head of the management team who encourages Hye-jin when she gets transfer to the editing team.
Jo Chang-geun as Kwang-hee, an employee of the Management team.
Jin Hye-won as Lee Seul-bi, an employee of the Management team.

Special appearances
Im Kang-sung as Ha-ri's date
Kim Sung-oh as the man at pub (ep. 3)
Hwang Seok-jeong as the ajumma in the restaurant on (ep. 7)
Kim Je-dong as The Most 20th Anniversary's party MC (ep. 9)
Lee Joon-gi as the guest for The Most 20th Anniversary (ep. 9)
Seo In-guk as the guest for The Most 20th Anniversary (ep. 9)
Uee as the guest for The Most 20th Anniversary (ep. 9)
Park Hyung-sik as the guest for The Most 20th Anniversary (ep. 9)
Lee Sang-hoon as interviewee for Editor Kim (ep. 11)
Richard Poon as Mr. Kang (ep. 12)
Kim Bo-min as Ji Yeon-woo, Sung-joon and Hye-jin's daughter (ep. 16)

Production
The first script writing was held on 10 August 2015.
 
The drama reunited Hwang Jung-eum with Park Seo-joon, who previously starred together in Kill Me, Heal Me; and Hwang Jung-eum with Go Joon-hee, who previously starred together in Can You Hear My Heart.

Original soundtrack

Part 1

Part 2

Part 3

Part 4

Part 5

Part 6

Ratings
 In this table,  represent the lowest ratings and  represent the highest ratings.
 NR denotes that the drama did not rank in the top 20 daily programs on that date.

Awards and nominations

Remake
 A Turkish remake of the drama, titled Seviyor Sevmiyor was aired in 2016 on ATV (Turkey).
 A Chinese remake of the drama, titled Pretty Li Hui Zhen started airing on Hunan TV in 2017.
 A Vietnamese remake of the drama, titled Mối Tình Đầu Của Tôi (My First Love) started airing on VTV3 in 2019.
 A Japanese remake of the drama, titled Kanojo wa Kirei Datta (lit. She Was Pretty) was aired in 2021 on Fuji TV.
 A Thai remake of the drama, titled รักวุ่นวายยัยตัวป่วน (Me Always You) was aired in 2021 on Channel 3 (Thailand).
 A Malaysian remake of the drama, which also titled She Was Pretty [ms] started streaming in 2022 on Viu.

References

External links
She Was Pretty official MBC website 
She Was Pretty at MBC Global Media

Korean-language television shows
2015 South Korean television series debuts
2015 South Korean television series endings
MBC TV television dramas
South Korean romantic comedy television series
South Korean workplace television series
South Korean television series remade in other languages
Television series by Bon Factory Worldwide